Badol Gaon is a small village in Kotdwara tehsil, Pauri Garhwal district in Uttarakhand State of India. Village has barely 13 houses with a population of 45 (mostly belonging to Kala community. It is administered by a Sarpanch who is an elected head of the village.

Village details
The village is surrounded by other small villages including Malya, Mandai, Bijnor. The nearest post office is in the adjacent village of Mandai which also has Intermediate college. The river Malini has its origin alongside this village. A few kilometers down the river is the Karnva ashram.

Badol Gaon has a small temple built in 2009 on land donated by Kedar Dutt Kala family. Like most villages of Uttarakhand here also most men have migrated to nearby towns for livelihood.  Every year a three days puja is organized in the village temple in the month of June when many residents who work in towns visit village for the puja.

References

Villages in Pauri Garhwal district